Dungog Shire  is a local government area in the Hunter region of New South Wales, Australia. The Shire is situated adjacent to the Barrington Tops and consists predominantly of very rugged to hilly country which becomes less rugged from north to south.

Dungog Shire was formed on 1 July 1958 through the amalgamation of Wallarobba Shire with the Municipality of Dungog.

The mayor of the Dungog Shire Council is Clr. John Connors, an independent politician.

Main towns/villages 

The major population centres within the Shire are Dungog, Gresford, Paterson, Vacy, Martins Creek and Clarence Town.  It also includes three main rivers, the Paterson River and Allyn River to the west and the Williams River to the east.

Demographics
Aboriginal and Torres Strait Islander people made up 3.2 per cent of the population, which was higher than the national and state averages of 2.5 per cent. The median age of people in the Dungog Shire was 44 years, significantly higher than the national median of 37 years. Children aged 0 – 14 years made up 18.8 per cent of the population and people aged 65 years and over made up 17.6 per cent of the population. Of people in the area aged 15 years and over, 54.7 per cent were married and 11.5 per cent were either divorced or separated.

When compared with total population growth of Australia for the same periods, being 5.78 per cent and 8.32 per cent respectively, population growth in the Dungog Shire local government area was approximately one-third of the national average. The median weekly income for residents within the Dungog Shire was lower than the national average.

Meanwhile, as at the census date, compared to the national average, households in the Dungog Shire local government area had a significantly lower than average proportion (2.0 per cent) where two or more languages are spoken (national average was 20.4 per cent); and a significantly higher proportion (95.0 per cent) where English only was spoken at home (national average was 76.8 per cent).

Council

Current composition and election method 
Dungog Shire Council is composed of nine councillors elected proportionally in three separate wards, each electing three councillors. All councillors are elected for a fixed four-year term of office. The mayor is elected by the councillors at the first meeting of the council. The most recent election was held on 17 September 2017. An election was held in the A, B and C Wards. The makeup of the council is as follows:

The current Council, elected in 2017, by ward, is:

Proposed merger
A 2015 review of local government boundaries by the NSW Government Independent Pricing and Regulatory Tribunal recommended that the Dungog Shire merge with adjoining councils. The government considered two proposals. Following the lodging of an alternate proposal by Mid-Coast Council Council to amalgamate the Gloucester, Great Lakes and Greater Taree councils, the NSW Minister for Local Government proposed a merger between the Dungog Shire and City of Maitland. In response to the government's proposal to merge the Newcastle and Port Stephens local government areas, Port Stephens Council has formally asked the government to evaluate a merger between Port Stephens and Dungog Shire. Although the Dungog Shire mayor is opposed to this merger, it is reported that the proposal has community support within both local government areas. The proposal was debated in the New South Wales parliament on 23 March 2016, with the Minister for Local Government confirming that the proposal had been referred to the Office of Local Government.

References

 
1958 establishments in Australia